The Mulichinco Formation is a geological formation in Argentina. It is Valanginian in age and is predominantly terrestrial, being deposited at a time of marine regression in the Neuquén Basin, and predominantly consists of siliciclastic rocks.

Fossil content 
Dinosaur remains have been found in the formation, including those of the dicraeosaurid Pilmatueia and carcharodontosaurid Lajasvenator. Flora recovered from the formation includes the tree fern Tempskya dernbachii and horsetail Equisetites.

References

Bibliography 
  
 
 
 

Geologic formations of Argentina
Lower Cretaceous Series of South America
Cretaceous Argentina
Valanginian Stage
Mudstone formations
Siltstone formations
Sandstone formations
Deltaic deposits
Fluvial deposits
Formations
Fossiliferous stratigraphic units of South America
Paleontology in Argentina
Geology of Neuquén Province